Maharana Pratap Horticultural University, Karnal (MHU) was established by the Government of Haryana at Anjanthali village of Karnal district of India. It is 21 km north of Karnal on NH1 leading to Ambala.

History 
On 28 November 2016,  the university came into existence via a legislative act of Haryana Vidhan Sabha. On  18 April 2017, Chief Minister Manohar Lal Khattar's  administration renamed it after the Maharana Pratap.

The university

Objective
It was established for research and development of horticulture.

Campus

Main campus
Main campus is in Anjanthali village in Nilokheri tehsil of Karnal after 97 acres land of HAU's Regional Research Station was transferred to the Horticulture university.  University has "Regional Research Stations" at Ambala, Jind and Jhajjar.

Regional research stations

Captain Pawan Kumar Extension campus, Jind
Captain Pawan Kumar Extension campus is being constructed at Badhana village in Jind district for which INR46 crore (460 million) was released in 2018.
RMRC murthal mushroom research center

Regional Research Station, Ambala
It is located at Naraingarh in Ambala district.

Regional Research Station, Jhajjar
It is located at Jhajjar district.

Collaboration
University is establishing a regional cold chain centre in collaboration with United Kingdom.

Related initiatives
Centre for excellence for horticulture are being established in each district of Haryana, along with 340 horticulture villages. Govt is also promoting an agricultural produce brand called Haryana Fresh.

See also 
 List of institutions of higher education in Haryana

References 

Horticulture in India
Horticultural organisations based in India
Agricultural universities and colleges in Haryana
Universities in Haryana
2016 establishments in Asia